Badu or Badu Island (also Mulgrave Island), is an island in the Torres Strait  north of Thursday Island, Queensland, Australia. Badu Island is also a locality in the Torres Strait Island Region, and Wakaid is the only town, located on the south-east coast. This island is one of the Torres Strait Islands. The language of Badu is Kala Lagaw Ya.

The Mura Badulgal (Torres Strait Islanders) Corporation administers land on behalf of the Badulgal people. The Mura Badulgal (Torres Strait Islanders) Corporation (an RNTBC) administers land on behalf of the Badulgal people.

History 
Kala Lagaw Ya is one of the languages of the Torres Strait. Kalaw Lagaw Ya is the traditional language used on the Western and Central islands of the Torres Strait. The Kalaw Lagaw Ya language region includes the territory within the local government boundaries of the Torres Shire Council.

In 1606, Luís Vaz de Torres sailed to the north of Australia through Torres Strait, navigating it, along New Guinea's southern coast.

Warfare (feuding, headhunting), farming, fishing, canoe building, house building, turtle and dugong hunting and a host of other activities were the main occupations of Badu men until the 1870s. However, headhunting and warfare along some pagan customs ceased with the adoption of Christianity.

Pearlers established bases on the island during the 1870s and by the early 1880s the islanders were becoming dependent on wages earned as lugger crews. At the same time, the first missionaries arrived. At the peak of the shell industry in the late 1950s, the Badu fleet of 13 boats employed a workforce of 200 providing work for many men, even from other islands as well. Once the shell trade declined, many people moved to the mainland for work.

Badu Island State School opened on 29 January 1905. On 1 January 2007, it became the Badu Island campus of Tagai State College.

The title deed was handed over by David Kempton, Assistant Minister for Aboriginal and Torres Strait Islander Affairs, to Badu Elder Lily Ahmat at a ceremony on the island. An Indigenous land use agreement was signed on 7 July 2014.

Facilities 

Infrastructure on Badu Island includes:

 airport
 regional council office
 state school (years 1 to 7)
 health centre with permanent doctor
 two grocery stores, with locally-owned J&J Supermarket
 post office
 Centrelink agency
 football field
 motel.

A number of other locally-owned run businesses are in operation at Badu including live seafood exports.

The Badu Island Indigenous Knowledge Centre (IKC) is located in the Rural Transaction Centre on Nona Street, and is operated by the Torres Strait Island Regional Council.  IKCs operate as libraries, meeting places, hubs, and keeping places. 

The Badhulgaw Kuthinaw Mudh Art Centre sees local arts display and cell their works, and internationally recognised with the works of artists such as Alick Tipoti and Laurie Nona.  Storing significant cultural artefacts, the centre also provides skills development and training.

Notable people
Notable people who are from or who have lived on Badu Island include:
 Ethel May Eliza Zahel (1877–1951), teacher and public servant.
Tanu Nona (1902–1980), pearler and politician.

See also

 Badu Island Airport
List of Torres Strait Islands

References

Bibliography

External links
 
 
 Torrens family photographs, photographic slides and film footage of Badu Island and Wujal Wujal, State Library of Queensland. Includes photos and video footage of Badu Island in the 1970s
 Far North and North Queensland photographs and slides, 1970-2018, State Library of Queensland. Collection includes photos of life and culture on Badu Island, such as sports games.

Torres Strait Islands
Headhunting
Torres Strait Island Region
Towns in Queensland
Localities in Queensland